Denise Manahan-Vaughan  is an Irish neuroscientist and neurophysiologist. She is head of the Department of Neurophysiology, Dean of Studies and Director of the International Graduate School of Neuroscience and co-founder of the Research Department of Neuroscience (founded in 2008) of the Ruhr University Bochum. Her research focuses on elucidation of the cellular and synaptic mechanisms underlying the acquisition and long-term maintenance of associative memories. She uses a multidisciplinary approach to study how spatial experiences, sensory input, neuromodulation, or brain disease impacts on, and provide insight into, the function of the hippocampus in enabling long-term memory.

Background and Education 
A native of Rathgar in Dublin, Ireland,  she studied  Natural Sciences at Trinity College Dublin, graduating with an honours degree, specialising in Physiology in 1988.  She  completed a PhD in Neuropharmacology/Neurophysiology in 1992.  In the mid 1990s she moved to Germany,  working first as a research scientist  at the Leibniz Institute for Neurobiology in Magdeburg, and completing a Habilitation degree in Physiology at the Otto von Guericke University in 1998.

She became associate Professor of Physiology at the Johannes Müller Institute for Physiology at the Charité in Berlin where she established the Synaptic Plasticity  Research Group.  In 2003,  she became Professor of Neuroscience at the Ruhr University Bochum, where she was head of the  Learning and Memory Research Unit. At this time she also  became Dean of Studies and Director of the International Graduate School of Neuroscience.

In January 2008 she became Chair of the Department of Experimental Neurophysiology  and in October 2010, Chair of the Department of  Neurophysiology,  within the Medical Faculty, of the Ruhr University Bochum.

She  is a niece of the renowned Irish actress, Anna Manahan and of Irish civil servant Michael Manahan. The marine scientist Donal T. Manahan is her second cousin and her brother is  geologist Alan P.M. Vaughan.

Additional academic activities 
In 2017, she became executive director of the Institute of Physiology. She is currently  speaker of the Collaborative Research Consortium on Integration and Representation of Sensory Processes (SFB 874)  (founded in 2010) that is funded by the German Research Foundation and speaker of the Research Department of Neuroscience of the Ruhr University Bochum. She is currently also acting  head of both the departments of cellular physiology and of systems physiology of the Institute of Physiology of the Ruhr University Bochum.

In 2010  she co-founded the Mercator Research Group on the Structure of Memory with the aim of creating a novel basis for research interactions and  collaborations between neuroscientists, cognitive scientists, philosophers and computational neuroscientists at the Ruhr University Bochum. This initiative that was funded by the Stiftung Mercator created a number of tenure-track professorships that focus on multidisciplinary memory research  and established a 7-Tesla small animal magnetic resonance imaging unit at the Ruhr University.

She is a member of the editorial board of NeuroForum and is an associate editor of both Frontiers in Behavioral Neuroscience and Frontiers in Integrative Neuroscience.

Roles in fostering the careers of young scientists, outreach, dissemination and gender equality

Fostering early career development 
In 2003 she co-founded the Network of European Neuroscience Schools (NENS) with the goal of optimising and increasing the international visibility of European graduate programs and graduate schools in neuroscience. NENS  was integrated into the Federation of European Neuroscience Societies] in 2005. She was chairperson of Network of European Neuroscience Schools (NENS)] in the period encompassing 2005-2010.  
She was a member of the  Executive Committee and Governing Council of the Federation of European Neuroscience Societies from 2005-2010.

From 2005 through 2010, she was also  speaker of the Competence Network for Neuroscience of the German Federal State of Northrhine Westphalia (NeuroNRW).  The goal of the network was to enhance ideas exchange, collaborative interactions and research visibility of neuroscientists in Northrhine Westphalia.

Since 2009  she has hosted an annual 2-day international conference on memory and cognition for the International Graduate School of Neuroscience.

Outreach and dissemination 
She established and  implements a variety of extensive outreach and dissemination strategies at the  Ruhr University Bochum aimed at raising the awareness of school pupils, from junior school through senior school levels, to the possibility of pursuing an academic career in neuroscience and at engaging the public and stakeholders with neuroscientific research and its findings.  These include Brain Day an annual event that offers lectures, interactive events and exchanges with patient representative groups, that is typically attended by over 400 members of the public, Brain Café and schools competitions.

She is a member of the executive board of RUBIN, the science outreach magazine of the Ruhr University Bochum.

In March 2019 she was elected to the Dana Alliance for Brain Initiatives.

Strategies to optimise gender equality in neuroscience 

In April 2019  she founded NeuroNEXXT, a digital platform aimed to raise the international visibility, networking opportunities and gender equality of female neuroscientists, at all career levels.

Research 
Her research focusses on characterising the  role that  synaptic plasticity and neural information processing plays in spatial memory and associative memory formation in the mammalian brain. Within this context she also studies the etiology and early pathogenesis of both psychosis and Alzheimer's disease. Her methodology  ranges from in vivo and in vitro  electrophysiological approaches, including single cell, single unit, local field potential and EEG neural signal analysis, through optogenetics, neuropharmacology, wide-field calcium imaging and trans-species cognitive studies. She has produced over 145 international scientific publications on the area of hippocampal function and memory encoding in the mammalian brain.

Selected works

Books

Book articles

Journal articles

References

External links 
Department of  Neurophysiology

Living people
Academic staff of Ruhr University Bochum
German women academics
Year of birth missing (living people)